Etihad Arena (initially known as Yas Bay Arena while under construction) is an indoor arena in Abu Dhabi, United Arab Emirates, located on the Yas Bay Waterfront district of Yas Island. Designed by HOK, the capacity of the venue is 18,000 and it is operated by Flash Entertainment.

History 

In 2018, its design received the 2018 MENA Green Building Award for "Sustainable Building Design of the Year".

In January 2020, naming rights for the new arena were sold to Etihad Airways.

Originally expected to open in March 2020, its opening was delayed due to event cancellations tied to the COVID-19 pandemic in the United Arab Emirates.

It opened in January 2021, with its first event being UFC on ABC: Holloway vs. Kattar. The arena held its second UFC event days later, hosting UFC on ESPN: Chiesa vs. Magny. The UFC had held mixed martial arts events on Yas Island behind closed doors in a bubble arrangement known as "Fight Island"; this marked the UFC's first event in the series to have spectators at a limited capacity. The promotion held its first PPV event that same month, hosting UFC 257: Poirier vs. McGregor 2. The UFC returned to Etihad Arena for UFC 267: Błachowicz vs. Teixeira in October 2021. The UFC returned to the arena in 2022 for UFC 280: Oliveira vs. Makhachev.

For hosting the 2021 World Swimming Championships in December 2021, a temporary pool was added to the arena.

On 21 May 2022, the arena hosted an exhibition boxing match between Floyd Mayweather and Don Moore. On November 5, 2021 a WBA light heavyweight title fight was held between Dmitry Bivol and Gilbert Ramirez.

In October 2022, the arena held two NBA preseason games between the Atlanta Hawks and the Milwaukee Bucks. The NBA Abu Dhabi Games 2022 will mark the league’s first games held in the UAE and the Arabian Gulf.

On 26 January 2023, the arena held Imagine Dragon's Mercury World Tour. It was the band's first concert in the city of Abu Dhabi.

Notable events
 UFC 257: Poirier vs. McGregor 2
 World Swimming Championships: 2021
 International Indian Film Academy Awards: 2022
 UFC 280: Oliveira vs Makhachev
 Disney on Ice
 Mercury World Tour

References

Indoor arenas in the United Arab Emirates
Sports venues in Abu Dhabi
Sports venues completed in 2021
2021 establishments in the United Arab Emirates